Frank L. Meyskens Jr. (born around 1946) is the former Daniel G. Aldrich chair and director of the Chao Family Comprehensive Cancer Center; currently professor of medicine at the University of California, Irvine.

Biography 
Meyskens received an MD from the University of California, San Francisco in 1972. At UC Irvine Meyskens holds appointments in cancer biology, epidemiology, public health, and pharmacological sciences.

Selected publications

References

External links 
 

Living people
University of California, Irvine faculty
University of California, San Francisco alumni
People from Orange County, California
American oncologists
American medical researchers
American academic administrators
Year of birth uncertain
Year of birth missing (living people)